Fort Howard may refer to:

Fort Howard (Maryland), a former fort in Baltimore County
Fort Howard, Maryland, a community at the location of the fort
Fort Howard Veterans Hospital, a former hospital
Fort Howard (Wisconsin), a 19th-century fort at Green Bay, Wisconsin
Fort Howard, Wisconsin,  a former city in Brown County, Wisconsin that was annexed to the City of Green Bay
Fort Howard Paper Company, formerly headquartered in Green Bay, later absorbed into the Georgia-Pacific company
Fort Howard (Missouri), a U.S. fort during the War of 1812 near the Battle of the Sink Hole on May 24, 1815